Lista is a former municipality in Vest-Agder county in Norway.

Lista may also refer to:

Places
Lista Lighthouse, in Lista, Norway
Alfonso Lista, Ifugao (formerly known as Potia), a third class municipality in the Philippines
Lista (Madrid), a ward in the Salamanca district of Madrid, Spain
Lista (Madrid Metro), a station on Line 4 of the Madrid Metro
Lista Point on the northwest coast of Smith Island in the South Shetland Islands, Antarctica

Media
Lista de Espera, a year 2000 Cuban film
Lista Przebojów Programu Trzeciego, the oldest and the longest-running music chart in Poland
VG-lista, a Norwegian record chart

People
Alberto Lista (1775–1848), Spanish poet and educationalist
Giovanni Lista (born 1943), Italian art historian and critic
Hildemaro Lista (1905 – unknown), Uruguayan fencer
Marquis of Lista, a former title of the Norwegian nobility associated with the eponymous town
Michael Lista (born 1983), Canadian poet
Stanislao Lista (1824–1908), Italian sculptor

Politics
Enotna Lista, an Austrian political party seeking to represent the Slovene minority in Carinthia
Lista civica, the generic name for independent party lists at Italian local elections
Lista della Libertà, a political coalition for the 2008 general election in San Marino
Lista Mancini, a former regional political party in Calabria, Italy
Zelena lista, a former green political party in Croatia

Other uses
Lista, an element in Microsoft Live Labs Listas
Lista (moth), a genus of snout moths
LISTA, a Swiss company
Library, Information Science & Technology Abstracts (LISTA), an indexing and abstracting service
List A cricket